Salah Mohamed Soliman Ibrahim Elfass (born 20 January 1990 in Mit Ghamr, Dakahlia, Egypt) is an Egyptian footballer. He plays as a centre-back or defensive midfielder for Egyptian Premier League giants Zamalek SC as well as the Egypt U-20 national team.

Honours
Zamalek SC
 Egypt Cup: 2013, 2014

References

1990 births
Living people
Egyptian footballers
Ghazl El Mahalla SC players
Zamalek SC players
ENPPI SC players
People from Dakahlia Governorate
Egypt international footballers
Association football midfielders
Egyptian Premier League players